Urumi (also known as Urumi: The Warriors Who Wanted to Kill Vasco Da Gama), is a 2011 Indian Malayalam-language epic historical drama film written by Shankar Ramakrishnan and directed as well as co-produced by Santosh Sivan. It features Prithviraj Sukumaran in lead role with an ensemble supporting cast.

The film is set in the early 16th century, when the Portuguese dominated the Indian Ocean. The story follows Murikkancheri Kelu (Prithviraj), seeking to avenge the death of his father at the hands of the colonizers, and his cohorts Vavvali of Nagapattinam (Prabhu Deva), princess Ayesha of Arackel (Genelia D'Souza) and princess Bala of Chirakkal (Nithya Menon). The plot incorporates the intrigues of the Chirakkal Royal Family, where Kelu serves as commander-in-chief, its rivalry with the house of Arackal, and the assassination of prince Bhanu Vikraman (Ankur Khanna). . The plot also incorporates such historical figures as Estêvão da Gama (Alexx O'Nell), Vasco da Gama (Alexx O'Nell & Robin Pratt) and Chenichery Kurup (Jagathy Sreekumar).

The film was made on a budget of more than ₹20 crore, making it the second-most expensive Malayalam film at the time, after Gokulam Gopalan's Pazhassi Raja (2009). The film also marked the debut of Prithviraj Sukumaran as producer. Urumi was released in Hindi as Ek Yodha Shoorveer, in Tamil as Urumi: Padhinaintham Nootrandu Uraivaal written by Sasikumaran and dubbed in Telugu with the same title, Urumi.

The film was critically acclaimed. It won two Kerala State Film Awards, for Best Background Music (Deepak Dev) and for Best Sound Recordist (M. R. Rajakrishnan). It also won the Best film and Best Director in Imagine India Film Festival in Barcelona. It was also the opening film of the Panorama Section in Goa Film Festival. Urumi is widely regarded as one of the defining movies of the Malayalam New Wave.

Plot
The executives of the multinational mining corporation Nirvana Group inform Goa-based Krishna Das that his ancestral property in north Kerala that was leased out to a non-governmental organisation (NGO) by his late grandfather, is rich in minerals and can be sold since the lease period has expired. Nirvana Group offers him a large sum of money as an advance on the purchase. The NGO currently runs a tribal school on the property, which is situated inside the Kannadi Forest Range. When Krishna Das and his friend Thanseer visit the property, they are kidnapped by the tribal men and taken to a cave deep in the forest. There, Krishna Das meets the tribal chief Thankachan, who explains to him that he is the descendant of a certain Chirakkal Kelu Nayanar.

Prologue:
In the early 16th century, Portuguese sailors under Vasco da Gama captures a Muslim pilgrim ship and take all the passengers as prisoners. The general of Chirakkal kingdom (northern Kerala), the Kothuwal, sends a Brahmin negotiator and his own son, Kelu (as per the customs of the land), to the captured ship to negotiate the prisoners' release. However, Vasco da Gama viciously rejects their attempt at negotiation, cutting off the negotiator's ears. He then orders that the prisoners be locked in the hold and the ship set on fire. Kothuwal storms the burning ship to rescue his son, Kelu. Although Kelu escapes, Chirakkal Kothuwal is killed during a fight that ensues. Vavvali, a Tamil Muslim boy, takes the orphaned Kelu with him to his home and treats him as his brother. Kelu crafts an urumi from the leftover ornaments of the dead women and children of the pilgrim ship. He takes an oath to kill Vasco da Gama one day.

Many years later, Kelu and Vavvali are hunting in a forest somewhere in Chirakkal. During their hunt, they rescue the princess of Chirakkal, Bala, from a group of abductors, armed with Portuguese pistols, who apparently have been organised by her cousin, Bhanu Vikraman. Under the orders of Bhanu Vikraman, Kelu and Vavvali are captured by the Chirakkal guards at Puthoor Ferry and tried before the king of Chirakkal. During the trial, Bala reveals that the two young men in fact saved her life from the goons. Chenichery Kurup, the king's minister, convinces the king that the abductors might be from the Arakkal kingdom.

The king grants Kelu and Vavvali an audience. During the conversation, Kelu learns that Vasco da Gama is scheduled to return to India as the Viceroy. They plan to infiltrate and capture Gama at the execution of "pirate" Balia Hassan at Fort Arakkal. Instead, they capture Estêvão da Gama and bring him as a prisoner to Chirakkal. In the process, Kelu and Vavvali come across and are helped by Ayesha, a fiery warrior princess of the Arakkal palace. With the help of Ayesha, Balia Hassan is also freed from the gallows and chaos ensues. Unknownst to Kelu and Vavvali, a group of Chirakkal warriors simultaneously raid the Arakkal palace, assassinates the Harabichi Beevi and take a large number of women from the palace as prisoners. Back in Chirakkal, the king bestows Kelu with the honour of being the new general ("Kothuval"). Vavvali, however, is somewhat unhappy as the king neglected to acknowledge his role in the capture of Estêvão. Princess Ayesha - among captives from the raid in Arakkal - is presented to the spoiled prince Bhanu Vikraman as a concubine. She tries to kill the prince in his chamber, but Kelu saves him. Vasco da Gama, in Cochin, is enraged upon learning of the capture and mutilation of his son Estêvão. Later, Kelu helps Ayesha escape from Chirakkal and asks her to flee from "this cursed land". Ayesha, with the help of Kelu and Vavvali, manages to rescue all the women locked up in Chirakkal and smuggle them to a secret cave in Puthur.

With princess Ayesha, Kelu and Vavvali set out to the villages in the kingdom and succeed in garnering support from the common folk against the Portuguese. A large number of people join with Kelu and Ayesha to form a resistance. Kelu also induces the king of Chirakkal to seek assistance from the Syrian Christians in Kodungallur. Meanwhile, with the help of minister Kurup, Bhanu Vikraman conspires against his uncle and joins forces with Estêvão da Gama. Bhanu Vikraman assassinates his uncle with a Portuguese pistol. Kelu returns to Chirakkal palace to discuss with Vikraman, now king of Chirakkal, what actions to take against da Gama, but Bhanu hesitantly states that the army will no longer take orders from Kelu. Chirakkal Bala, the princess of Chirakkal, now joins with Kelu and his cohorts. Meanwhile, da Gama, accompanied by Estêvão da Gama among others, arrives at the Chirakkal palace. Chenichery Kurup, whom da Gama remembers, at first sight, welcomes him. During the audience, Bhanu Vikraman is killed by Estêvão da Gama. As a mark of respect for his allegiance to the Portuguese crown, the empire offers Kurup the post of the Governor General of the Laccadives.

The Chirakkal army, led by Angadan Nambi, attacks the rebel hideout. Rebels under Kelu, Vavvali, Ayesha and defected Chirakkal general Kaimal, fight back. Soon, an Estêvão da Gama-led Portuguese unit arrives in the village as reinforcement for the Chirakkal force. The rebels manage to defeat the combined forces, but Vavvali is killed in action. The rebels now launch an attack on the Chirakkal palace. A terrible battle ensues. The rebels are immediately put on the defensive by the Portuguese cannons. Kelu manages to breach the perimeter set up by Estêvão and enters the palace. He manages to attack da Gama but is killed by the musketeers.

After hearing the moving story of his ancestors, Krishna Das decides not to sell his land to the multinational mining corporation and instead, he decides to start a new life in Kerala.

Cast
 Prithviraj Sukumaran – Chirakkal Kelu Nayanar; Krishna Das ("K. D.")
Dhananjay - young Kelu
 Prabhu Deva – Vavvali of Nagapattinam; Thanseer ("Tarzan")
Aadhil - young Vavvali
 Genelia D'Souza – Ayesha of Arackal; Urmila 
 Nithya Menen – Bala of Chirakkal; Daisy da Cunha, head of the Real Estate Division, Nirvana
Alexx O'Nell – young Vasco Da Gama, Estêvão da Gama; executive of Nirvana
Robin Pratt – old Vasco Da Gama
Amole Gupte – king of Chirakkal
 Ankur Khanna – Bhanu Vikraman of Chirakkal
 Jagathy Sreekumar – Chenichery Kurup; Kerala Minister
 Soubin Shahir -Tribal Gang Member 
 Shaji Nadesan – MLA Raveendra Kaimal; Kaimal
 Sasi Kalinga – Arakkal Hasim (Azim) Marakkar; Advocate Hashim
Kani Kusruti – the bard in Chirakkal court
Deepak Jethi - Balia Hassan
Tanusree Kausal - Arakkal Beevi
Sheela - Vavvali's mother
Aju - Mangadan Nambi
Sreekala Sasidharan - Aima

Cameo appearances 
 Vidya Balan – Makkom; teacher Bhumi
 Arya – the Kothuwal of Chirakkal; Thankachan (voice dubbed by Prithviraj Sukumaran)
 Tabu – a special appearance in the song "Aaranne Aarane"

Themes 
According to director Santosh Sivan, Urumi is his comment on globalization. He adds that the film resonates with people today as corporate lobbies are causing displacement of indigenous people across the world. "I have travelled across the world while shooting for films and documentaries and I have seen first hand the displacement and exploitation, the side effects of globalisation being suffered by the people who live in close contact to nature. The film centres around a similar situation, but it is removed by a few centuries," said Sivan. The film also focuses on a new perspective of storytelling. "History is written by the victors, the powerful who won. So was Vasco da Gama a brave explorer or an invader after gold." he added.

"The film is designed in such a way that it talks about the present and the past. In the past, some people came and exploited our land and it is happening even now. Perhaps the people who lived then are the people who live now. Still we are not united and our progress is not uniform. The film has also portrayed this aspect in a different manner.", Sivan pointed out to Jyothsna Bhavanishankar of "Behind the Woods".

Shankar Ramakrishnan, who wrote the story and screenplay for Urumi after conducting extensive research, said that the film presents history from a different perspective. "Even a small child in Kerala perceives Vasco da Gama as an explorer, who made the first-ever colonial invasion in any part of the world. But there's more to him than that. Urumi is an attempt to portray or rather discuss the many realities that could have affected the course of our history," he said. Shankar Ramakrishnan added that the title is not just suggestive of Kelu's weapon urumi, but "the feeling of vengeance that we carry in our hearts".

Production

In April 2011, Prithviraj Sukumaran explained the genesis of his production company: "Santosh [Sivan] and I used to keep discussing a historical film during the making of [2010 Tamil film] Raavanan. We roped in Shaji Nadesan, a friend of ours, and thus was born August Cinema." "I like the idea of recreating the bygone era. It is interesting to think of the characters you have heard as real. Also, it excited me to have cannons, swords, and urumi (curling blades) in a film." Santosh Sivan was quite enthusiastic about the idea.

Santosh Sivan and Prithviraj Sukumaran have acknowledged the vital role played by the script writer Shankar Ramakrishnan in the shaping of the film. Ramakrishnan, who had been working for some time as film-maker Ranjith Balakrishnan's associate director, had scripted a tale for a competition based on the medieval history of Kerala. "Called Chekavar, it was on the gallant warriors of Malabar and the pageant of the Mamankam. I had shown it to Prithviraj [Sukumaran] during the shooting of Thirakkatha. He was quite taken up with the script and mentioned it to Santhosh [Sivan] when the two were working on Raavanan. That is how Santosh [Sivan] got in touch with me," explains Shankar Ramakrishnan. "I was nearly imprisoned in Santosh Sivan's flat in Mumbai for about two months when I was writing the story of Urumi. Finally, I told him the one-line story of a boy who wanted to kill Vasco da Gama and the movie took off smoothly from then on. I did not see it as a period film as I felt that the issues it dealt with were contemporary", reveals Shankar Ramakrishnan. Shankar spent two years gathering the material for his script and doing research to flesh out his characters, some of whom are familiar names in Indian history. He went to Kannur and read old ballads and stories of the region.

Alexx O'Neill, who hails from Connecticut in the United States, was cast as Estêvão da Gama. "When I had signed Urumi, it was basically for a single character Estêvão Da Gama, but later I played [young] Vasco Da Gama's role, too, and had to speak only in Portuguese", O'Neill said. "I wanted to be very true to the accent and the way the character would speak at that time. So I hired a person in Mumbai before the shooting began. Even during the dubbing I had someone to assist me, so that I don't go wrong with the pronunciation", he added.

The 16th century costumes were designed by debutant Eka Lakhani, with make-up by Ranjith Ambady. The clothing worn by the characters, particularly that worn by the women, differed slightly from what would be historically accurate attire. "You cannot re-create exactly how it was then, as women were topless in those days. So, you stylise the kind of dresses they wore in that era," Sivan said to Rediff. Shooting for the film started on 17 August 2010. The production design was carried out by Sunil Babu. The main locations were Kerala and the forests of Malshej Ghat in Maharashtra. Most of the scenes were captured in mostly natural light with a modest of budget and minimal visual effects. "It was tedious and the terrain was difficult. On screen, it looks beautiful but we shot standing in slush almost 24/7. People got foot infections. It was laborious", says Nithya Menon, who played a Chirakkal princess. The film was shot with a combination of various formats. The Canon EOS 5D was extensively used, especially for the sensuous song featuring Vidya Balan. The shooting lasted a period of seven months in the states of Kerala, Karnataka and Maharashtra.

Urumi was filmed by three cinematographers – Santosh Sivan (who is the director of photography as well), renowned wild-life photographer Alphonse Roy, and national award-winning Anjuli Shukla. "Shooting in the mist-laden Harishchadragad in Malshej valley is a difficult task as the light keeps changing constantly. It rains incessantly and the entire area is covered in slush. So each scene is a challenge. It is great to be a part of such a talented team," says Anjuli. Sunil Babu, the set designer for movies such as Ghajini, Lakshya and Ananthabhadram, was art director for the film. Visual effects were carried out by Mumbai-based Reliance Mediaworks.

Santosh Sivan was heavily involved in bringing out a "tailored version" of the film in Telugu 2011, and in Tamil in 2012. Many scenes in the film were re-shot to avoid lip-sync problems.

The English version 
The English version is expected to be just 110 minutes long, which is 55 minutes shorter than the Malayalam film. The director confirmed that the English version will showcase the brutal side of the Portuguese invader. The English version will be released in 2015. "The English flick, titled "Vasco Da Gama", is totally different from the Malayalam version in terms of structure and story. "We will be retaining only 30% of the scenes from the original", said Santosh Sivan, adding that the extra sequences are already shot. The script is being sponsored by a forum of the Hong Kong International Film Festival.

Reception

Critical response

The first exclusive sneak preview of the film was held exclusively for Mani Ratnam. After watching the film, Mani Ratnam was all praise for Santosh Sivan, saying, "Urumi is huge. It is entertaining and the performances are very convincing. It's simply Santosh [Sivan] magic."

The film opened to positive reviews from both critics and viewers. It earned accolades as "arguably one of the best historical fantasies Malayalam cinema has ever seen" and was critically acclaimed at film festivals around the world. The Hindu described the film as "a landmark film in Malayalam". Sarswathy Nagarajan describes, "It is a decisive turn for Malayalam cinema because 'Urumi,' while broadening the horizons of Mollywood, is also an attempt to reach out to a global audience. The lavishly made 'Urumi' brings together a host of talented actors and technical personnel from Indian cinema." Times of India praised the film's acting performances, technical details, cinematography.

"Nowrunning" gave the film a 3/5 rating and comments that the story is "timeless, the images magical, the acting solid, the script first-rate, the romance delightful, the action deadly and the energy raw – in short, the kind of film that one loves to see, and then animatedly write about." Rediff also gave a 3/5 rating for the movie. Sify gave a 4/5 rating with its movie verdict being "Very Good". According to Sify, "Urumi is a fairy tale fantasy film that has a heart and technical artistry." Indiaglitz rated the movie as a "must see" and commented: "All in all, Urumi is a must watch for all those who love quality cinema. Redefining the traditional qualities of period dramas, Urumi is sure to become a movie that will be respected and adored by Mollywood for its creative panache, tremendous performances, and great technical wizardry."

The film was also one of the seven Malayalam films selected to be screened at the Indian Panorama section of International Film Festival of India.

The Tamil version released by Kalaipuli S Dhanu's V Creations opened to positive reception by critics as well as audiences. "The Hindu" wrote of the Tamil version, "From the very first scene of this film to the last, director-cum-cinematographer Santosh Sivan proves to be on top of this technical masterpiece. The songs, waterfall sequences and the war scenes evoke a feel of realism due to its stunning visuals and brilliant re-recording. Certain portions in the film become very melodramatic to suit the Indian audiences thereby derailing the pace. The brilliantly choreographed action sequences seem to be a tad too loud for the ears." Notable websites and Tamil magazines praised the dialog of the Tamil version. The film was released as "Ek Yodha Shoorveer" in Hindi in 2016 and was widely criticised for "laughable dubbing".

The film has also caught the eye of Oliver Stone. "I had met Stone while he was in Mumbai a few months ago and he was curious when he came to know that I was doing a film on Da Gama. We had a discussion about it and he wanted me to send him a copy once the film was done," said Santosh Sivan.

Box office 
The film fetched over The film had collected  from 3 days at 77 theatres from Kerala and it had broken previous record of Prithviraj Sukumaran film Anwar (2010). The film became a notable hit in Tamil and Telugu as well. The film collected 7,023 from UK box office.

Accolades

Soundtrack
The songs and the background score for the film were composed by Deepak Dev, with lyrics by Kaithapram Damodaran Namboothiri, Rafeeq Ahammed and Engandiyur Chandrasekharan. The music album consists of nine songs. According to Deepak Dev, composing songs for Urumi was a challenge as Santosh Sivan had proscribed all electronic music, as the film is set in the sixteenth century. It was Prithviraj who suggested Deepak Dev to Sivan. The songs encompass many genres, including folk, lullaby and ballad. The vocalists range from the most experienced K. J. Yesudas to newcomers Job Kurian and Reshmi Sathish. The song "Chimmi Chimmi" is done as a tribute to composer Deepak Dev is said to have admired.

Tamil Tracklist

Plagiarism accusations
The song "Aaro Nee Aaro" in the film is alleged to be plagiarised from Loreena McKennitt's "Caravanserai" of the album An Ancient Muse. The track also uses major hooks from Loreena's famous track "The Mummers' Dance". Loreena McKennit filed a plagiarism suit against composer Deepak Dev and the makers of Urumi in Delhi High Court. On 21 September 2011, Justice Manmohan Singh passed an order on a copyright infringement claim preventing the makers from releasing the soundtrack in English, Hindi, and Tamil. Since the producers failed to appear in court, Delhi High court Judge Hema Kohli passed an arrest warrant against actor Prithviraj, Santhosh Sivan and Shaji Natesan.

See also
 List of Asian historical drama films

References

External links
 
 

2010s Malayalam-language films
2010s historical action films
Films set in the 16th century
Kalarippayattu films
Films set in Kerala
Films shot in Maharashtra
Films shot in Kerala
Films shot in Thalassery
Films shot in Kannur
Films shot in Kozhikode
Indian epic films
Indian historical action films
History of India on film
History of Kerala on film
Films involved in plagiarism controversies
Age of Discovery films
Cultural depictions of Vasco da Gama
Films directed by Santosh Sivan
2011 action films
2011 films